Austrheim is a municipality in the Nordhordland region of Vestland county, Norway. The administrative centre of the municipality is the village of Årås. Other villages in the municipality include Austrheim and Kaland. The Mongstad industrial area lies along the border of Austrheim and neighboring Lindås municipality. The westernmost point of mainland Norway lies in the municipality at Vardetangen.

The  municipality is the 347th largest by area out of the 356 municipalities in Norway. Austrheim is the 231st most populous municipality in Norway with a population of 2,889.

In 2016, the chief of police for Vestlandet formally suggested a reconfiguration of police districts and stations. He proposed that the police station for Austrheim and Fedje be closed.

General information

Historically, Austrheim was a part of the large Lindås Municipality. On 1 January 1910, the northwestern district of Lindås (population: 2,518) was separated from Lindås to form the new municipality of Austrheim. On 1 January 1947, all of the islands located west of the Fedjefjorden (population: 920) were separated to form the new Fedje Municipality. During the 1960s, there were many municipal mergers across Norway due to the work of the Schei Committee. On 1 January 1964, the Straume area on the island of Radøy (population: 56) was transferred from Austrheim to the new Radøy Municipality.

Name
The municipality (originally the parish) is named after the old Austrheim farm, since the first Austrheim Church was built there. The first element is austr which means "east" and the last element is heimr which means "homestead" or "farm". Until 1889, the name was written Østereim. After that the spelling was Austreim, and most recently it is spelled Austrheim.

Coat of arms
The coat of arms was granted on 17 February 1989. It shows three silver bows (as in the shape of a rainbow) on a blue background. The three bows represent the many bridges in the island municipality.

Churches
The Church of Norway has one parish within the municipality of Austrheim. It is part of the Nordhordland prosti (deanery) in the Diocese of Bjørgvin.

Government
All municipalities in Norway, including Austrheim, are responsible for primary education (through 10th grade), outpatient health services, senior citizen services, unemployment and other social services, zoning, economic development, and municipal roads. The municipality is governed by a municipal council of elected representatives, which in turn elect a mayor.  The municipality falls under the Hordaland District Court and the Gulating Court of Appeal.

Municipal council
The municipal council of Austrheim is made up of 17 representatives that are elected to four year terms. The party breakdown of the council is as follows:

Mayor
The mayors of Austrheim (incomplete list):
2011–present: Per Lerøy (Ap)
2003-2011: Ole Lysø (Ap)

Economy
The Mongstad industrial complex lies on the border of Austrheim and Lindås. It is the largest oil port and refinery in Norway, is responsible for about 70% of all wet bulk. Many residents of Austrheim work at the facility.

Geography
Austrheim is an island municipality in the Nordhordland region of Vestland county. It is located south of the Fensfjorden, east of the Fedjefjorden, north of the island of Radøy, and west of the Lindås peninsula. The municipality includes the far northwestern tip of the peninsula as well as many islands. The largest island (by far) is the island of Fosnøyna, where the municipal centre is located.

Gulen Municipality is located to the north (across the fjord), Fedje Municipality is located on islands to the west, Alver Municipality lies to the south.

Notable people
 Kornelius Bergsvik (1889 in Austrheim – 1975) a Norwegian politician & County Governor of Telemark
 Karsten Solheim (1911–2000) golf equipment manufacturer, emigrated to the United States aged 2
 Haakon Austrheim, geology professor in Oslo
 Roger Helland (born 1993 in Austrheim) former football player with over 230 club caps 
 Gunnar Norebø (born 1976 in Austrheim) a retired Norwegian football midfielder

References

External links

Municipal fact sheet from Statistics Norway 

 
Municipalities of Vestland
1910 establishments in Norway